Thomas Godwyn (before 1561 – after 1586), of Banwell, Somerset, was an English politician.

Family
Godwyn was the eldest son of Thomas Godwyn, bishop of Bath and Wells and Isabel Purfrey, the daughter of Nicholas Purfrey of Shelston, Buckinghamshire.  He married twice: Frances, who died in 1588 and Margaret Bowerman of Wells, Somerset. In 1589, his sister's husband, Thomas Purfrey, represented Wells.

Career
He was a Member (MP) of the Parliament of England for Wells in 1586.

References

Year of birth uncertain
Year of death uncertain
English MPs 1586–1587
People from Banwell